Get Your Face On is a reality show on TLC. It aired for ten episodes, beginning in December 2008.

The show is about a group of make-up artists from the greater Los Angeles area competing to become the protégé of Napoleon Perdis.

External links

2000s American reality television series
2008 American television series debuts
2008 American television series endings
TLC (TV network) original programming
Television series by Evolution Film & Tape